Michigan International Speedway (MIS) is a  moderate-banked D-shaped speedway located off U.S. Highway 12 on more than  approximately  south of the village of Brooklyn, in the scenic Irish Hills area of southeastern Michigan. The track is used primarily for NASCAR events. It is sometimes known as a sister track to Texas World Speedway, and was used as the basis of Auto Club Speedway. The track is owned by NASCAR. Michigan International Speedway is recognized as one of motorsports' premier facilities because of its wide racing surface and high banking (by open-wheel standards; the 18-degree banking is modest by stock car standards).

History 
Groundbreaking took place on September 28, 1967. Over  of dirt were moved to form the D-shaped oval. The track opened in 1968 with a total capacity of 25,000 seats. The track was originally built and owned by Lawrence H. LoPatin, a Detroit-area land developer who built the speedway at an estimated cost of $4–6 million.  LoPatin was President of American Raceways and had a controlling interest in Atlanta International Raceway, Trenton Speedway, Texas World Speedway and Riverside International Raceway until the company went bankrupt in 1971.   Financing was arranged by Thomas W Itin. Its first race took place on Sunday, October 13, 1968, with the running of the USAC 250 mile Championship Car Race won by Ronnie Bucknum.

In 1972, Roger Penske purchased the speedway for an estimated $2 million. During Penske's ownership the track was upgraded several times from the original capacity to 125,000 seating capacity. From 1996 to 2000, the track was referred to as Michigan Speedway. This was to keep consistency with other tracks owned by Roger Penske's Motorsports International before its merger with ISC.

In 1999, the speedway was purchased by International Speedway Corporation (ISC) and in 2000 the track was renamed to its original name of Michigan International Speedway. In 2000 10,800 seats were added via a turn 3 grandstand bringing the speedway to its current capacity. In 2004-2005 the largest renovation project in the history of the facility was ready for race fans when it opened its doors for the race weekend. The AAA Motorsports Fan Plaza—a reconfiguration of over  behind the main grandstand. A new, three-story viewing tower housing the Champions Club presented by AAA and 16 new corporate suites targeted VIP guests, while a press box and a race operations facility high above the  oval welcomed the media and race officials. Michigan was repaved prior to the 2012 season. This marks the first time since 1995 that the oval was resurfaced, along with 1967, 1975, and 1986. Also new for 2012 was the addition of a new 20-space trackside luxury campsite to be known as APEX. Situated in turn 3, each site will offer a  area. To accommodate these new campsites, the remaining silver grandstands in turns 3 and 4 were removed.

On January 28, 2019, it was revealed on ISC's 2018 annual report that the speedway's track seating was reduced from 71,000 to 56,000.

Notable accidents 
Mother's Day Sunday-
May 11, 1969, the Michigan International Speedway hosted the Wolverine 4-Hour Trans-Am race, the opening round for the 1969 Sports Car Club of America's Trans-Am Series. The event, held on the newly inaugurated Grand Prix road course, a 3.5-mile (5.632-kilometer) configuration designed by the Formula 1 star Stirling Moss, which included the extended outfield road course plus part of the banking in clockwise direction, was overshadowed by the death of a spectator and several more injured.   This was the first fatality of the new track's two-years history.

On the eighth lap of the race, the Shelby Team 1969 Ford Mustang Boss #2 driven by the Austrian born Australian driver Horst Kwech, spun into a spectator area in the field located on grass, that was sodden with rain, snow and hail that had soaked it earlier in the day. Kwech, as did the other front runners Parnelli Jones and George Follmer, started the race from the inside of the second row on dry tires, and rain began falling as soon the flag was waved. It is not clear whether he had already pitted for a tire change.

Despite Horst Kwech's efforts, the out of control car left the track at an estimated speed of 120 mi/h (193 km/h) and went through the fence. It hit a number of spectators and smashed into two parked AMC Javelins. Twelve spectators were injured, some of them critically; another one, a fifty-year old man named Derwood S. Fletcher, an AMC employee, (partner and vice president of the Bill Richard Inc. Buick and Rambler Dealership in Mason, MI) who was sitting in one of the cars with his wife Lorna, was taken by helicopter to Jackson's Foot Hospital, where he succumbed to his head, chest and back injuries.

July 16, 1972: Merle Bettenhausen crashed into the outside wall on the backstretch during the USAC Champ Car Michigan 200. He tried to climb out of the car while it was still going but his right arm was caught in between the moving car and the backstretch wall and was severed, ending his racing career.
September 17, 1977: Al Holbert flipped on the backstretch during the first race of the 1978 IROC V racing season. The car then slid hundreds of feet on its roof before stopping near turn 3.
June 17, 1979: Steve Pfeifer, substituting for Roger Hamby during the middle of the race, crashed heavily and went over the pit wall during the Gabriel 400, internally injuring freelance photographer Ray Cook. Cook survived, while Pfeifer only suffered cuts on his chest and right knee.
July 25, 1981: A. J. Foyt slammed sideways into the Armco barrier during the Michigan 500 and almost lost an arm.
July 22, 1984: Al Unser Jr. and Chip Ganassi crashed into the inside retaining wall on the backstretch. The crash effectively ended Ganassi's driving career.
July 22, 1984: Pancho Carter flipped violently on the final lap of the Michigan 500.
September 1984: Derek Daly was nearly killed in a horrible crash in the CART PPG Detroit News Grand Prix 200. The front end of his car was sheared off and he suffered multiple injuries including a crushed left ankle, double compound fracture to the left tibia and fibula, fractured left hip socket, severely fractured pelvis, several broken left side ribs, broken left hand, 3rd degree burns to the left arm, dislocated right foot and ankle, deep abrasions and soft tissue to right heel, and internal bleeding.
August 1985: During practice for the Michigan 500, polesitter Bobby Rahal crashed hard into the wall, an accident blamed on the newly introduced Goodyear radial tires. Competitors refused to race the following day, and the race was postponed. The following weekend, just 10 of 30 cars finished the race, 10 due to mechanical failures and 10 due to wrecks. Danny Ongais flipped several times down the backstretch while Mario Andretti broke his collarbone and hip, and had to miss the next race.
June 1986: Rick Baldwin crashed in turn 2 during Winston Cup qualifying. His window net failed when he smacked the wall with the driver's side of the car. His head protruded enough out of the window to smack the wall. He sustained massive head injuries and was in a coma for 11 years before dying in 1997. He was 42.
August 1992: Clifford Allison, son of retired NASCAR driver Bobby Allison, was killed during a practice-run crash for the Busch Series race.
August 1993: In a Busch Grand National Series race, Johnny Benson got airborne on the backstretch and flipped five times before coming to rest. He was uninjured.
August 1994: Ernie Irvan crashed in an early morning practice session. Emergency workers at the track extricated him from the car, and he was immediately airlifted to Saint Joseph's Hospital in Ann Arbor, Michigan. He was diagnosed with critical brain and lung injuries and given only a 10% chance of surviving the night. After making a full recovery, Irvan returned to NASCAR in 1995. In 1997 Irvan won his final race at the June race at Michigan. Exactly 5 years after his near fatal accident there, Irvan crashed at Michigan while driving his own #84 Irvan-Simo Federated Auto Parts Pontiac in a practice session for the Busch Series race. Ernie was again airlifted from the track and was diagnosed with a mild head injury and a bruised lung as a result of the accident. Less than two weeks later, on September 3, 1999, at a tearful press conference in Darlington, SC, where he was surrounded by his wife and two children, Irvan announced his retirement from driving.
July 30, 1995: On lap 194 of the Marlboro 500, Lyn St. James experienced a mechanical failure in turn 1, spun and collected Danny Sullivan, which resulted in a broken pelvis and the end of his open-wheel racing career.   
July 28, 1996: On the first lap of the Marlboro 500, Emerson Fittipaldi tried to overtake Greg Moore for third place in turn 1, but they had contact and Fittipaldi's car spun into the outside wall. As the result of the accident, Fittipaldi had his seventh cervical vertebrae smashed. The accident ended his professional career.
July 26, 1998: Three spectators were killed and six injured from flying debris during a CART race crash. Those killed were Kenneth Dale Fox, 38, of Lansing, Michigan; and Sheryl Ann Laster, 40, and Michael Terry Tautkus, 49, of Milan, Michigan.
June 10, 2000: Elliott Sadler went on a wild ride when he flipped twelve times in a practice accident after cutting a tire in turn 1. Little footage of the accident has surfaced. Sadler recalled years later that there was footage of the accident, but it was destroyed by NASCAR due to the car having reached higher than the turn 1 catchfencing.
August 2003: Todd Bodine and Kurt Busch got together in turn 2 on lap 63. Bodine's car went up the track into Kenny Wallace and turned head-on into the wall. Todd's car lifted into the air onto the hood of Wallace's and slid down the track as Wallace's car burst into flames. Both drivers quickly got out of their cars and were uninjured.
 June 19, 2004: Chad McCumbee rolled over six times after contact with a few cars in an ARCA race.
 August 5, 2007: Dario Franchitti went spectacularly airborne during the IRL Michigan/Firestone Indy 400, but escaped without significant injury.
June 2009: Brian Scott pounded the turn 4 wall, breaking his wrist in a Camping World Truck Series race.
August 2012, Pure Michigan 400: On lap 64, Mark Martin was about to lap Bobby Labonte and Juan Pablo Montoya when Labonte got loose. Martin and Kasey Kahne got collected, and while Kahne slid through the infield grass, Martin spun down pit road and his car caught the pit road opening in Kahne's pit stall, right behind the driver's compartment. Martin was uninjured.

Other events 
In addition to motor racing, the venue hosts a number of events including the Michigan High School Athletic Association cross country finals for the Lower Peninsula and the annual Make-A-Wish Bicycle Tour.  The track also hosts concerts in conjunction with its race weekends. Driving schools are held throughout the year. The Formula SAE competition is now held at MIS, after previously being held in the parking lot of the Pontiac Silverdome. Since 2010, it has hosted the Michigan Wine and Beer Festival, and since 2013, the venue has hosted the country music festival Faster Horses.

Records

Track records

NASCAR Cup Series records 

*

Lap Records
The official race lap records at Michigan International Speedway are listed as:

References

External links 

Michigan International Speedway official site
RacingCircuits.info's history of Michigan International Speedway

Michigan International Speedway page on NASCAR.com
Fansite for the track's infield camping

Champ Car circuits
IndyCar Series tracks
NASCAR tracks
Buildings and structures in Jackson County, Michigan
Motorsport venues in Michigan
ARCA Menards Series tracks
International Race of Champions tracks
Sports venues completed in 1968
NASCAR races at Michigan International Speedway
IMSA GT Championship circuits
Tourist attractions in Jackson County, Michigan
1968 establishments in Michigan
Road courses in the United States